Headstrong is the debut studio album by American singer Ashley Tisdale, released on February 6, 2007, by Warner Bros. Records.  Tisdale began working on the project after the first installment of High School Musical (2006), and after she had achieved the feat of being the first female artist to debut with two songs on the Billboard Hot 100. Tisdale describes her work on the album saying. "I didn't really know who I was and I was trying to figure out who to do. I now am way more comfortable in my own skin." The singer worked with a variety of established writers and producers on the album, including Diane Warren, J.R. Rotem, Ryan Tedder, Evan "Kidd" Bogart, and Kara DioGuardi, among others. Commenting that the album garnered its title from her personality, Tisdale said she wanted to use her first album to formally introduce herself personally, not as one of the characters she portrays.

Headstrongs music derives mainly from the genres of pop and R&B, provided by electronica. Meanwhile, it incorporates hip hop beats and some tracks infuse dancehall and other world music. The album also lyrically explores themes in teen pop. Many critics compared her first effort to the first works of fellow Disney-alums Britney Spears and Christina Aguilera. Carrying primarily an urban tone, the "hip pop" of Gwen Stefani is also said to be an influence on the album. Headstrong itself was given mixed reviews by critics, who while complimenting it overall, called it ordinary and panned the ballads. Critics were also ambivalent towards Tisdale's vocal performance. Whereas, the album debuted at number five on the Billboard 200, selling over 64,000 copies in its opening week, it also charted in numerous international markets. It was later certified Gold by the Recording Industry Association of America and Irish Recorded Music Association.

The album's lead single, "Be Good to Me," charted moderately in the United States and select European markets. The second single from the album, "He Said She Said," peaked at 58 in the US and appeared on several international charts, peaking within the top 20 in Germany and Austria. The last two singles were released exclusively in certain European countries. The third single, "Not Like That" charted in the top half of several European charts, while the fourth and final single "Suddenly" charted in Germany. Tisdale supported the album with promotional appearances, High School Musical: The Concert, and her tour, Headstrong Tour Across America. The album was voted as the sixth best album of 2007 by the readers of Billboard.

Background and development
Tisdale got her first start on Billboard when she became the first female artist in history to debut with two songs on the Billboard Hot 100, from the soundtrack of High School Musical. Tisdale called the feat "crazy," stating, "When I think about artists like Madonna and Beyoncé...it's surreal. I seriously can't comprehend it." Soon after the completion of High School Musical, Tisdale began work on her debut album. In December 2006, producer J.R. Rotem confirmed he was producing and writing with Tisdale for the album.

Tisdale said that the album was an opportunity for her fans to get to know her better, commenting, "People know my characters, but they don't know me." Noting that she never spills much information about her life in interviews, she also said that the album talks about life and things personal to her. Regarding the previous statement, the singer said she wanted people to understand that she was normal, and how they could relate to her. Tisdale titled the album Headstrong, because she calls herself a "headstrong" type of person, commenting that she was the term in the sense of knowing how she wants to look, sing, and come across. In addition to wanting to record songs that "touched" her and those that she could personally identify with, she co-wrote three songs on the album, "Over It," "Not Like That," and "Suddenly."

"Don't Touch (The Zoom Song)" is a cover song, originally performed by Tata Young, while the Diane Warren-penned "Love Me for Me" was originally a leftover track recorded by American girl group Dream for their 2003 album Reality, however it was left unreleased. It would later be recorded and popularized by South African girl group Jamali. Tisdale collaborated with Rotem, Ryan Tedder, and Evan "Kidd" Bogart on "He Said She Said." Tisdale also worked heavily with production teams The Matrix and Twin. Additionally, Diane Warren, David Jassy, Guy Roche, Shelly Peiken, Sarah Hudson, Samantha Jade, and Bryan Todd were the other remaining music veterans that worked on the project, with the rest being relatively unknown writers. While the album does not contain credited featured artists, Jassy, Jack D. Elliot, Keely Pressly, Lauren Christy, Scott Spock, Graham Edwards, Kara DioGuardi, Victoria Sandstorm, Windy Wagner, Bryan Todd, Tata Young, and Marissa Pontecorvo provide background vocals on tracks. Jassy performed rap interludes on "Be Good to Me," which he co-wrote. The album was released in the United States on February 6, 2007.

Composition

Headstrong derives mainly from the genres of pop, electropop, and R&B while incorporating dance-pop themes and hip hop and dancehall elements. It carries many elements of hip pop itself, and has been compared to the music of Gwen Stefani. The title track "Headstrong" mixes "slinky" verses with cheerleader chants like Stefani's "Hollaback Girl."  The album begins with a "futuristic" introduction which contains excerpts of other songs on the set. "So Much For You" is a dance song about a confident girl who wants true love. "He Said She Said" has been described as "steamy dancefloor seduction." "Be Good to Me" contains an urban beat. "Not Like That," which contains influences of Middle Eastern music, covers the topic of the  "familiar misunderstood-celebrity," but was referred to as more "worked up" than "whiny." Containing rap interludes by Tisdale and clap along beats,  according to Gary Graff of Billboard, the song is also liking to Stefani. "Positivity" makes use of syncopated beats and "old-school" synths.  "Over It" has "boingy" effects. "Goin' Crazy" has similarities to Britney Spears' "(You Drive Me) Crazy," while "Suddenly" seems to cover Tisdale discovering her stardom. Jon Dolan of Blender coined the song "The Little Mermaid-worthy." Spears is also said to be an influence of Tisdale's "husky, alto" voice in "Over It," and "So Much For You." The dance song "Don't Touch (The Zoom Song)" has an '80's style beat.

Promotion

To promote the album, Tisdale appeared in several live and televised appearances, performing the singles, "Be Good to Me" and "He Said She Said." On February 6, 2007, she appeared and performed on Good Morning America, and appeared at a signing at FYE in West Nyack, New York.  The following day when the album was released, she performed on Live With Regis and Kelly. On February 8, 2007, she appeared in the studios of WPIX and KTLA for their respective morning news shows. Tisdale also appeared at a Verizon Wireless store in Pasadena, California on February 10, 2007, to promote the set. She also performed "He Said She Said" on The Early Show. Additionally, Tisdale performed cuts from the album during her solo set list on High School Musical: The Concert. On October 22, 2007, Tisdale co-hosted MTV's TRL. During the winter, she performed at Christmas at Rockefeller Center, Z100's Jingle Ball, Y100's Jingle Ball, and Q102's Jingle Ball.

Singles
The album's lead single, "Be Good to Me" was released to mainstream airplay as the album's lead single on March 6, 2007. It was originally released as a B-side for the promo release of "He Said She Said." The single peaked at number 80 on the Billboard Hot 100, while reaching 67 in Austria and 57 in Germany.  The second single, "He Said She Said," originally released as a promo single for the album, was sent to mainstream radio on November 6, 2007. The single peaked at 58 in the United States, 21 in Austria, 17 in Germany, and 62 in Canada. It was later certified Gold in the United States by the Recording Industry Association of America for shipments of over 500,000 copies. "Not Like That" served as the third single in several European countries, first released on January 25, 2008. It peaked in the top 20 of Germany, top 30 in Switzerland, and at number 31 in Austria. The fourth and final single from Headstrong was "Suddenly," which select European markets also received. It was released on May 2, 2008, and peaked at 45 in Germany.

Headstrong Tour Across America

Headstrong Tour Across America was the debut concert tour by American recording artist Ashley Tisdale to promote the album. The backstage of the tour were shown on DVD There's Something About Ashley.

Critical reception

Heather Phares of AllMusic rated the album 3 out of 5 stars and commented, "her voice is pleasant enough, but it's not especially distinctive, and she's not helped by a batch of songs that aren't nearly as charming as High School Musical's tunes." Phares also said that although the album wasn't winning considering the high-profile songwriters and producers involved, "it's fine for anyone who just wants to hear more of Ashley Tisdale's -- and not Sharpay Evans' -- singing." Jon Dolan of Blender said Tisdale did not import her "spunky" High School Musical character in the album, and that even with the quality of producers, "no stylistic slipper fits right." Gary Graff of Billboard said Tisdale went, "the contemporary CHR school of fellow Mouse products Britney Spears and first-album Christina Aguilera—lots of synthesizer-laden, beat-heavy, layered-vocal dance tracks" that varied between "come-hithers" and "self-affirming anthems." Graff commented, "she'll have to develop a more defined identity before she can truly win our affections." James Ross of The Arizona Daily Wildcat commended the album's uptempo songs but critiqued the ballads, commenting she hits the right notes on uptempo numbers, while on ballads, "Any 'Musical' fan knows that Tisdale can belt one out, but this is not apparent on the album." Overall, Ross said, "Although the album fails in places, it is ll  a worthy attempt by an up-and-coming pop artist to please her audience."

Commercial performance
The album debuted at number five on the Billboard 200 in the US, selling over 64,000 copies in its first week. On June 3, 2008, the album was certified Gold by the Recording Industry Association of America (RIAA) for sales of over 500,000 units. The album sold over 564,000 copies in United States as of July 13, 2009  and 1.1 million copies worldwide as of February 2010. The album debuted on the Austrian Albums Chart at number 33, and after its fifth week on the chart, it peaked at 21. In its opening week on New Zealand Albums Chart and the Swiss Albums Chart, it peaked at 22 and 98, respectively. On the Australian Albums Chart, it peaked at 80, while spending 33 weeks on the German Albums Chart, peaking at 23. Headstrong also peaked at 155 on the UK Albums Chart and 16 on the Irish Albums Chart, and was later certified Gold in the latter region by the Irish Recorded Music Association.

Track listing

Samples
 "Be Good To Me" contains an uncredited sample of "Feelgood Lies" by German girl-group No Angels, written by Pelle Ankarberg, Charlie Dore, Niclas Molinder, Maryann Morgan and Joacim Persson.
 "Don't Touch (The Zoom Song)" is a cover of the song "Zoom" by Tata Young released in 2006.

Personnel
Credits adapted from Headstrong at Allmusic.

Lead vocals – Ashley Tisdale, David Jassy
Background vocals – David Jassy, Jack D. Elliot, Keely Pressly, Lauren Christy, Scott Spock, Graham Edwards, Kara DioGuardi, Victoria Sandstorm, Windy Wagner, Bryan Todd, Tata Young, Marissa Pontecorvo
Keyboards - Rasmus Billie Bähncke
Bass – Adam Anders
Guitar – Adam Anders, Emanuel Kiriakou and Joacim Persson

Production
Executive Producers: Lori Feldman and Tom Whalley
Vocal Producers: Adam Anders and Nikki Hassman
Mastering: Chris Gehringer
Mastering Assistant: Will Quinnell
Engineers: Adam Anders, Rasmus Billie Bähncke, Dushyant Bhakta, Stuart Brawley, Steve Churchyard, Joe Corcoran, Dave Dillbeck, Kara DioGuardi, Chris Holmes, Emanuel Kiriakou, Alan Mason, The Matrix, Greg Ogan and Twin
String Arranger: David Campbell
Assistant Engineers: Tom Bender and Cliff Lin
A&R: Tommy Page
Photography: Mark Liddell & Brian Bowen Smith
Art Direction: Ellen Wakayama
Design: Julian Peploe

Charts and certifications

Charts

Year end charts

Certifications

|-
| Ireland (IRMA)
| Gold
| 7,500
|-
| United States (RIAA)
| Gold
| 500,000
|-
| Argentina (CAPIFF)
| Gold
| 20,000
|-
|}

References

2007 debut albums
Albums produced by Emanuel Kiriakou
Albums produced by Guy Roche
Albums produced by J. R. Rotem
Albums produced by the Matrix (production team)
Albums produced by Twin
Ashley Tisdale albums
Warner Records albums